William Preston Johnston (January 5, 1831 – July 16, 1899) was a lawyer, scholar, poet, and Confederate soldier. He was the son and biographer of Confederate General Albert Sidney Johnston. He was a president of Louisiana State University and the first president of Tulane University from 1884 (Tulane being renamed from the University of Louisiana that year).

Biography
Johnston was born in Louisville, Kentucky, to Albert Sidney Johnston and Henrietta Preston Johnston. When he was four years old, his mother died; he was then reared by members of her family. Johnston attended several local schools, including the academy of Samuel Venable Womack in Shelbyville, Centre College in Danville, Western Military Institute in Georgetown, and Yale College. In March 1853, he received his law degree from the Louisville School of Law. On July 6, 1853, he married his first wife, Rosa Elizabeth Duncan, the daughter of John N. Duncan of New Orleans.

During the American Civil War, Johnston served as an aide-de-camp to Jefferson Davis, president of the Confederate States. Johnston was a colonel in the Confederate Army. Johnston was captured with Jefferson Davis at Irwinville, Georgia, at the end of the war, and was imprisoned for several months at Fort Delaware.

After the war (at the invitation of Robert E. Lee), he became a professor at Washington College in Virginia. In 1880, he became president of Louisiana State University, but resigned four years later to become the first president of the new Tulane University in 1884.

Johnston wrote two books of poetry, My Garden Walk (1894) and Pictures of the Patriarchs and Other Poems (1895).  He also wrote The Prototype of Hamlet and Other Shakespearean Problems (1890) as well as a biography of his father, The Life of General Albert Sidney Johnston (1878), a "most valuable and exhaustive biography".

Johnston was elected a member of the American Antiquarian Society in 1893.

His first wife died on October 19, 1885, and he married Margaret Henshaw Avery of Avery Island, Louisiana, in April 1888. At the age of 67 on July 16, 1899, he died at the home of his son-in-law, Congressman Henry St. George Tucker in Lexington, Virginia.

References

Colonel William Preston Johnston, The Life of General Albert Sidney Johnston: His Service in the Armies of the United States, the Republic of Texas, and the Confederate States.
Reviewed work(s): William Preston Johnston:  A Transitional Figure of the Confederacy. by Arthur Marvin Shaw
"Col. Wm. Preston Johnston, The Gallant Son of the Great Southern Chieftan," New Orleans, La. Daily Picayune (July 17, 1899).
http://www.csawardept.com/history/Cabinet/WPJohnston/index.html 

Specific

External links
 

   * as 'University of Louisiana'

1831 births
1899 deaths
Centre College alumni
William Preston
Confederate States Army officers
Writers from Louisville, Kentucky
Tulane University faculty
Presidents of Tulane University
Yale College alumni
Washington and Lee University people
People of Kentucky in the American Civil War
Members of the American Antiquarian Society
Preston family of Virginia
Southern Historical Society